The Malmeoideae are a subfamily of trees and other plants of the family Annonaceae.

Tribes and Genera
The Angiosperm Phylogeny Website, which recognises Malmeoideae as one of four subfamilies, containing 9 tribes and the following genera:

Annickieae 
Auth: Couvreur et al., 2019
 Annickia Setten & Maas - monotypic tribe with African genus

Piptostigmateae 
Auth: Chatrou & Saunders 2012 - African genera:
 Brieya
 Greenwayodendron Verdc.
 Mwasumbia Couvreur & D.M. Johnson
 Piptostigma Oliv.
 Polyceratocarpus Engl. & Diels
 Sirdavidia Couvreur (monotypic)

Malmeeae 
Auth: Chatrou & Saunders 2012 - tropical Americas
 Bocageopsis R.E.Fr.
 Cremastosperma R.E.Fr.
 Ephedranthus S.Moore
 Klarobelia Chatrou
 Malmea R.E.Fr.
 Mosannona Chatrou
 Onychopetalum R.E.Fr.
 Oxandra A.Rich. (black lancewood)
 Pseudephedranthus Aristeg.
 Pseudomalmea Chatrou
 Pseudoxandra R.E.Fr.
 Ruizodendron R.E.Fr.
 Unonopsis R.E.Fr.

Maasieae 
Auth: Chatrou & Saunders 2012
 Maasia Mols et al. - W Indo-China to New Guinea

Fenerivieae 
Auth: Chatrou & Saunders 2012
 Fenerivia Diels - Madagascar endemic

Phoenicantheae 
 Phoenicanthus Alston - Sri Lanka

Dendrokingstonieae 
Auth: Chatrou & Saunders 2012
 Dendrokingstonia Rauschert - W Malesia

Monocarpieae 
Auth: Chatrou & Saunders 2012
 Monocarpia Miq. - W Malesia

Miliuseae 
Auth: Hooker & Thomson 1855
 Alphonsea Hook.f. & Thomson (S. China to Tropical Asia)
 Desmopsis Saff. (Mexico to Colombia, Cuba)
 Huberantha Chaowasku (Tropical & Subtropical Africa & Asia, Madagascar, SW. Pacific)
 Marsypopetalum Scheff. (Hainan, Indo-China to W. & Central Malesia)
 Meiogyne Miq. (India, Indochina to Australia, Fiji)
 Miliusa Lesch. ex A.DC. (Tropical & Subtropical Asia to N. Australia)
 Mitrephora (Blume) Hook.f. & Thomson (S India, Southeast Asia)
 Monoon Miq. (India, Indo-China, Malesia, New Guinea and Australia)
 Neo-uvaria Airy Shaw (Indo-China to W. & Central Malesia)
 Orophea Blume (Tropical & Subtropical Asia)
 Phaeanthus Hook.f. & Thomson (Vietnam to New Guinea)
 Platymitra Boerl. (Thailand to W. & Central Malesia)
 Polyalthia Blume (Madagascar, Tropical & Subtropical Asia to NE. Australia)
 Polyalthiopsis Chaowasku (Vietnam)
 Popowia Endl. (tropical Asia and Africa and Oceania)
 Pseuduvaria Miq. (tropical SE Asia)
 Sageraea Dalzell (tropical Asia)
 Sapranthus Seem. (Mexico to Colombia)
 Stelechocarpus Chaowasku (Indo-China to Western and Central Malesia) - Stelechocarpus burahol
 Stenanona Standl. (Mexico, Central and South America)
 Tridimeris Baill. (Mexico)
 Trivalvaria (Miq.) Miq. (Tropical Asia including Hainan)
 Wangia X. Guo & R.M.K. Saunders (central & southern China)
 Wuodendron B.Xue, Y.H.Tan & Chaowasku (China, Vietnam)

References

External links 
 

Annonaceae
Plant subfamilies